Silovan Yakimovich Kakabadze ( 12 August 1895 – 10 June 1993) was a Soviet and Georgian sculptor and teacher. He was a rector of the Tbilisi State Academy of Arts (1936-1942).

Among his works is a collection of portraits of Georgian figures carved in the manner of Auguste Rodin. Among his pupils was Irakli Ochiauri.

References

1895 births
1993 deaths
20th-century artists from Georgia (country)
20th-century sculptors
People from Khoni
Communist Party of the Soviet Union members
Tbilisi State Academy of Arts alumni
Academic staff of the Tbilisi State Academy of Arts
Stalin Prize winners
Recipients of the Order of Friendship of Peoples
Recipients of the Order of the Red Banner of Labour
Painters from Georgia (country)
Sculptors from Georgia (country)
Soviet sculptors
Education in Tbilisi